George Bernard Blake (4 September 1878 – 6 February 1946) was an Australian sportsman who competed in the 1906 Intercalated Games and 1908 Summer Olympics as a long distance runner. He also played Australian rules football with St Kilda and Carlton in the Victorian Football League (VFL).

Biography
Blake, the son of Irish immigrants, had 10 siblings. One of them, Tom Blake, was also a league footballer and distance runner of note. Another, Mick Blake, also played in the VFL.

In 1897, Blake made three appearances for St Kilda, in the inaugural VFL season. He played three more games in 1898 and then, due to his running career, had to wait five years for his seventh and final league game with St Kilda. He returned for the 1905 to play one more game, this time at Carlton.

A national record holder for the 10 miles, Blake was one of Australia's leading long distance runners of the early 1900s and was a member of the East Melbourne Harriers Athletic Club. He went to Auckland in 1901 for the Australasian Championships and finished second in the three miles, but was the first placed Australian.

He was one of just four Australians to go to Athens in 1906 for the Olympics. His first event was the Men's 1,500 metres where he finished far back in his heat and missed the final. The longer distances were more to his liking and in the Men's five mile race he placed sixth out of 28 competitors.

Blake's best performance of the 1906 Games was in the Men's Marathon, where he was the only athlete from the southern hemisphere to compete. He was leading the race at the 24 km mark, by a distance of 1200 metres, but succumbed to cramp. Blake was still able to finish the race and finished sixth, in a time of three hours, nine minutes and thirty five seconds. He was involved in a sprint for the finish with Greece's Ioannis Alepous, who beat him to the line by ten seconds. His placing was not bettered by an Australian at an Olympic Games until Robert de Castella finished fifth in 1984.

Blake made the long journey to Europe again two years later to participate in the London Olympics, this time competing for Australasia. He narrowly missed out on making the Men's Five Mile final after finishing third in his heat and only the top two qualified. In the marathon he couldn't repeats his performance from Athens and didn't finish the race. He could however feel aggrieved as his retirement after five and a half miles was due to an injury sustained when the bicycle riding attendant collided with him while giving out refreshments.

Notes

References

1878 births
Australian rules footballers from Melbourne
St Kilda Football Club players
Carlton Football Club players
Australian male long-distance runners
Australian male marathon runners
Olympic athletes of Australia
Olympic athletes of Australasia
Athletes (track and field) at the 1906 Intercalated Games
Athletes (track and field) at the 1908 Summer Olympics
Australian people of Irish descent
1946 deaths
Athletes from Melbourne
People from St Kilda, Victoria